Verticordia jamiesonii  is a flowering plant in the myrtle family, Myrtaceae and is endemic to the south-west of Western Australia. It is small shrub with short leaves crowded on young branchlets and white to pale pink flowers in small groups on the ends of branches in early spring.

Description
The leaves near the flowers are slightly larger than those further down the stems.

Flowering occurs from September to October.

Taxonomy and naming
Verticordia jamiesonii was first formally described in 1883 by Ferdinand von Mueller from specimens collected in 1882 by John Forrest, near the Gascoyne River. The description was published in "Southern Science Record".

The specific epithet (jamiesonii) honours James Jamieson, a lecturer in obstetric medicine at the University of Melbourne from 1879 to 1908.

When Alex George reviewed the genus in 1991, he placed this species in subgenus Eperephes, the only species in section Jamiesoniana.

Distribution and habitat
This verticordia grows in sand or clay on low lateritic breakaways and on rocky hills in open shrubland. It occurs as scattered populations, mostly on pastoral leases between the Gascoyne River and Yalgoo and in the Gibson Desert in the Gascoyne, Gibson Desert, Great Victoria Desert, Murchison and Yalgoo biogeographic regions.

Conservation
Verticordia interioris is classified as "Priority Three" by the Western Australian Government Department of Parks and Wildlife meaning that it is poorly known and known from only a few locations but is not under imminent threat.

Use in horticulture
The tiny leaves, shiny red new growth and feathery flowers of this verticordia have been described as "attractive" features and the plant has been cultivated since 1991. Propagation has usually been from cuttings and the plants have established in sand with gravel in full sun. They are relatively drought and frost hardy as well as resistant to the fungal disease that affect some other eremophilas.

References

jamiesonii
Rosids of Western Australia
Eudicots of Western Australia
Plants described in 1883
Taxa named by Ferdinand von Mueller